Ozyptila distans is a species of crab spider in the family Thomisidae. It is found in the United States and Canada. It can commonly be found on coniferous logs.

References

distans
Articles created by Qbugbot
Spiders described in 1975
Spiders of Canada
Spiders of the United States